Karen L. Bennett (born January 10, 1956) is an American politician. She is a member of the Georgia House of Representatives from the 94th District, serving since 2013. Bennett has sponsored 150 bills. She is a member of the Democratic party.

References

Democratic Party members of the Georgia House of Representatives
21st-century American politicians
21st-century American women politicians
Women state legislators in Georgia (U.S. state)
Living people
1956 births